The Lenne is a tributary of the river Ruhr in the Sauerland hills, western Germany. It has caused flooding in recent years.

With an average discharge of 25 m³/s near its mouth, it is the main tributary of the Ruhr.

References

 

Rivers of North Rhine-Westphalia
 
Rivers of Germany